Moerkerke is a town in the Belgian province West Flanders and a part (deelgemeente) of the city of Damme

External links
Moerkerke @ City Review

Populated places in West Flanders
Damme